Chethackal  is a village in Pathanamthitta district in the state of Kerala, India.

Demographics
 India census, Chethackal had a population of 15781 with 7607 males and 8174 females.

See also
 Ranni
 Pathanamthitta district

References

Villages in Pathanamthitta district